Alden House may refer to:

In the United States
Alden House (Bentonville, Arkansas), listed on the NRHP in Arkansas
Ebenezer Alden House, Union, ME, listed on the NRHP in Maine
John and Priscilla Alden Family Sites, Duxbury, MA, listed on the NRHP in Massachusetts
Arthur Alden House, Quincy, MA, listed on the NRHP in Massachusetts
William E. Alden House, Southbridge, MA, listed on the NRHP in Massachusetts